The men's 4 × 400 metres relay event at the 2005 Asian Athletics Championships was held in Incheon, South Korea on September 2–4.

Medalists

Results

Heats

Final

References

Results

2005 Asian Athletics Championships
Relays at the Asian Athletics Championships